Robert Joseph Banks (born February 26, 1928) is an American prelate of the Roman Catholic Church, serving as bishop of the Diocese of Green Bay in Wisconsin from 1990 to 2003.  He also served as an auxiliary bishop of the Archdiocese of Boston in Massachusetts from 1985 to 1990.

A protegee of Cardinal Bernard Law, Banks was questioned about his role in the sex abuse scandal in the Archdiocese of Boston in the early 2000s.

Biography

Early life
Banks was born on February 26, 1928, in Boston, Massachusetts, to Robert and Rita (Sullivan) Banks.  He attended primary school in the Winthrop School District in Winthrop, Massachusetts, then went to Cathedral High School and Saint John's Seminary, both in Boston,

Banks finished his studies for the priesthood at the Pontifical North American College and the Pontifical Gregorian University in Rome.

Priesthood 
On December 20, 1952, Banks was ordained to the priesthood by Cardinal Luigi Traglia for the Archdiocese of Boston in the Archbasilica of Saint John Lateran in Rome. Banks received his Licentiate in Theology in 1953 and his Doctor of Canon Law degree from the Pontifical Lateran University in Rome in 1957.

After his ordination, Banks served as an associate pastor in several parishes until 1959. From 1971 to 1981, he worked as a professor of canon law, academic dean, and rector at St. John Seminary. After leaving St. John Seminary, he served in parish ministry as vicar general and vicar for administration.  In 1981, Banks was appointed as parochial vicar of St. Mark's Parish in Dorchester, Massachusetts. In 1984,  he was named as pastor of Sacred Heart Parish in Roslindale, Massachusetts.

Auxiliary Bishop of Boston
On July 26, 1985, Pope John Paul II appointed Banks as auxiliary bishop of the Archdiocese of Boston. He was consecrated by Cardinal Law on September 19, 1985, at the Cathedral of the Holy Cross in Boston. While auxiliary bishop, Banks also served as pastor at St. Mary's Parish in Dedham, Massachusetts.

In 1985 a doctor sent Banks a complaint about Joseph E. Birmingham, a priest in the diocese.  The complaint stated that Birmingham had sexually abused a large number of boys during his assignments to various parishes, dating back to 1963. In court testimony on January 14, 2003, Banks was asked about how he tracked down Birmingham's victims. Banks' response was "I don't recall doing anything." Banks said that in 1987 he did not stop Birmingham's return as a parochial vicar to St. Brigid's Parish in Lexington, Massachusetts.

On February 2, 1990, Banks wrote a reference letter to the Diocese of San Bernardino in Southern California for Paul Shanley, then a priest in the Diocese of Boston.  Despite allegations in Massachusetts against Shanley of sexual abuse of minors, Banks wrote that Shanley was "a priest in good standing."  Shanley was ultimately laicized and convicted of child abuse.  In an interview years later, Banks denied knowing about any prior allegations against Shanley could not remember checking his personnel file.  However, in 1985, Banks did listen to a tape recording of Shanley at a public meeting in Rochester, New York.  In the meeting, Shanley promoted sex between adults and children and said that children were typically the seducers in such relationships.  When asked about that recording in court, Banks said he had forgotten about the recording when he wrote the 1990 reference letter to the Diocese of San Bernardino.

Bishop of Green Bay
On October 10, 1990, Pope John Paul II appointed Banks as bishop of the Diocese of Green Bay and titular bishop of Taraqua.  The next day, Banks had to return to Boston for heart bypass surgery.

Banks served as a member of the Committee on Education of the United States Conference of Catholic Bishops (USCCB) from 1990 to 1993 and served as its chair from 1993 to 1996. In 1996, he became the USCCB treasurer.

Banks also served as chair of the National Catholic Education Association from 1998 to 2002. He was a member of the board of trustees for the Catholic University of America. Banks served on the Permanent Interdicasterial Commission for the Distribution of Priests. In 1998, Banks accompanied Pope John Paul II on his visit to Cuba. He later returned to Cuba to meet with Cuban bishops.

Retirement 
On February 26, 2003, Bank's 75th birthday, he submitted his letter of resignation as bishop of Green Bay to Pope John Paul II.  The pope accepted his resignation on October 10, 2003. After his retirement, Banks spent 2 years assisting at Holy Rosary Parish in Kewaunee, Wisconsin and St. Mary Parish in Algoma, Wisconsin.

See also

 Catholic Church hierarchy
 Catholic Church in the United States
 Historical list of the Catholic bishops of the United States
 List of Catholic bishops of the United States
 Lists of patriarchs, archbishops, and bishops

References

External links
Roman Catholic Diocese of Green Bay
Roman Catholic Archdiocese of Boston

1928 births
Living people
Roman Catholic Archdiocese of Boston
Clergy from Boston
Religious leaders from Wisconsin
20th-century Roman Catholic bishops in the United States
21st-century Roman Catholic bishops in the United States
Roman Catholic bishops of Green Bay
Clergy from Dedham, Massachusetts
Catholics from Massachusetts